Michael Jackson: The Immortal World Tour was the first of two theatrical productions by Cirque du Soleil to combine the music of Michael Jackson with Cirque du Soleil's signature acrobatic performance style. The show was written and directed by Jamie King and produced in partnership with the Estate of Michael Jackson. The arena show—which is very similar to a rock concert—began its tour on October 2, 2011, in Montreal. After touring North America for one year, Immortal continued through Europe, Asia, Australia, New Zealand and the Middle East before returning to North America in February 2014 for a total of 501 shows from 141 cities. It is the most financially successful Cirque production and highest grossing tribute show in history.

By December 2011, just two months after it was launched, the show had sold over $100 million in tickets from US and Canada dates and became the top touring act in America, according to Forbes. The tour wrapped in mid-2014 after amassing $371 million in revenue with ticket sales of 3.7 million from 27 countries ranking the tour as the eighth highest-grossing tour of all time.

Public reception
The show attracted numerous celebrities such as Brad Pitt, Angelina Jolie, Jay-Z, Beyoncé Knowles, Rihanna, Eva Longoria, Courteney Cox, Josh Groban, Jennifer Lopez, Tyra Banks, Naomi Campbell, the cast of Glee, Andrew Garfield, Emma Stone and Cee-lo Green.

Background and development
On November 2, 2010, Cirque du Soleil and Jackson's estate announced the development of The Immortal World Tour through Michael Jackson's official website. In a press release, the company stated, "A riveting fusion of visuals, dance, music and fantasy that immerses audiences in Michael's creative world and literally turns his signature moves upside down, Michael Jackson: The Immortal World Tour unfolds Michael Jackson's artistry before the eyes of the audience. Aimed at lifelong fans as well as those experiencing Michael's creative genius for the first time, the show captures the essence, soul and inspiration of the King of Pop, celebrating a legacy that continues to transcend generations".

Director Jamie King, who had previously spearheaded tours by Britney Spears (The Circus Tour), Madonna (Sticky & Sweet Tour), Celine Dion (Taking Chances World Tour) and Rihanna (Last Girl on Earth), stated that he wanted to include Jackson's "giving tree" as the focus of the tour.

As noted during an interview with Daniel Lamare, within 24 hours of opening ticket sales for the show, Cirque du Soleil sold 200,000 tickets.

Following the commercial and critical success of the show, a second Cirque du Soleil production based on Jackson's music titled Michael Jackson: One was developed for a permanent residency show at the Mandalay Bay Resort and Casino in Las Vegas. This second show opened in May 2013 to critical acclaim and commercial success.

Acts 
The acts of The Immortal World Tour were staged to the music of Michael Jackson. Cirque gathered a creative team of 10 high-profile choreographers, some of whom worked with Michael, to design the acts.
 Childhood: The Mime awakens the inhabitants.
 Wanna Be Startin' Somethin': Dance and acrobatic number.
 Fanatics – Shake Your Body (Down to the Ground): Five fanatics take pictures of the audience and try to get into the gates of Neverland.
 Dancing Machine: Welders perform on motorized cables.
 Ben: A celebration of Jackson's love of animals.
 This Place Hotel: Aerial tango.
 Smooth Criminal: Dance routine.
 Dangerous: Pole-dancing act.
 Fanatics – The Jackson 5 Medley: The fanatics are in a competition and are granted access to Neverland.
 Mime: Mime gains the talents of Jackson and performs beatbox.
 Human Nature: Aerial hoops.
 Scary Story – Is It Scary: Contortion act.
 Bats – Threatened: Aerial act.
 Thriller: Free-running parkour act.
 Swans – I Just Can't Stop Loving You: Straps duo act.
 Beat It: The Fanatics manipulate Jackson's iconic accessories.
 Jam: Hip-hop dance choreography with basketballs.
 Earth Song: Mime is tangled in the tree, which is now turned upside down.
 Scream: Tumbling (men's rhythmic gymnastics) and aerial act.
 Gone Too Soon: The Mime cradles four horses in this ballad.
 They Don't Care About Us: Dance choreography.
 Heal the World – Will You Be There: Artists descend onto the stage with glowing red hearts.
 I'll Be There: The 11-year-old voice of Jackson and a single piano track.
 Megamix – Can You Feel It/Don't Stop 'Til You Get Enough/Billie Jean/Black or White: Swiss rings act, dance choreography, and world dance styles.
 Man in the Mirror: This finale is a celebration of Michael Jackson.

Costumes 
Zaldy Goco, The Immortals costume designer, said the following in regard to his inspiration for the collection of 252 costumes: "My approach has been to draw upon and respect Michael's iconic style while creating something new and fresh. I placed subtle references throughout the costumes in the show." The color palette chosen for the show is rich, lively, and ornate such as through the usage of gold and crystals. The design team explored such technologies as 3D printing and LED lighting for the many different colored pieces.

Highlights of the costumes range from 3D printing techniques to pyrotechnics being built into the designs.
 Gangster characters wield 3D-printed surreal guns that shoot pyrotechnics when the triggers are pulled. The shoulder pads are also 3D-printed.
 The straps duo costumes are covered in Swarovski crystals, and were inspired by Jackson's corseted wrist in the Black and White video.
 The bat costumes are created using ultra lightweight paper used for shipping parcels.
 The soldiers' costumes are primarily made of mytex on a polyester frame with padding.
 All the costumes in the Human Nature act are equipped with more than 275 LED lights.
 The costumes for the welders were inspired by the red, zipper-clad jacket in Beat It.

Music 

On October 3, 2011, Sony Music Entertainment announced that more than 40 of Jackson's original recordings were redesigned and reimagined by the Justin Timberlake and Rihanna producer Kevin Antunes throughout a year-period work in the studio with original multi-track master recordings. Hence it's expected that Immortal will continue a similar mixing production to the soundtracks to previous Cirque du Soleil shows: 2006's Love, with the remixed music of The Beatles (to the show of the same name), and 2010's Elvis Presley-themed remix soundtrack Viva Elvis (to the show of the same name).

Released by Epic Records in conjunction with estate of Michael Jackson, Immortal features an alternative version of The Jackson 5 song "ABC", as well as a series of mashups and remixes such as a choir-assisted rendition of "They Don't Care About Us". Although more than 60 songs were used for the stage show, the album release made available is a 20-track album or a deluxe 27-track album only. More than 2 million copies of the Immortal album have been sold worldwide.

Setlist 
The following songs were performed in the tour:
 "Opening Megamix": "Dirty Diana" / "Get on the Floor" / "P.Y.T. (Pretty Young Thing)" / "Heartbreaker" / "The Way You Make Me Feel" / "You Rock My World" / "Unbreakable" / "Blood on the Dance Floor" / "Baby Be Mine" / "Rock with You" / "Lovely One" / "Burn This Disco Out" (Pre-show music)
 "Workin' Day and Night"
 "The Immortal Intro" (Video interlude)*
 "Childhood"
 "Wanna Be Startin' Somethin'"
 "The Jackson  5 Medley": "I Want You Back" / "ABC" / "The Love You Save" (Placed after "Mime Segment" on the album) (Only on selected days)
 "Shake Your Body (Down to the Ground)" (Only on selected days)
 "Dancing Machine" / "Blame It on the Boogie" / "Why You Wanna Trip on Me"
 "Ben"
 "This Place Hotel"
 "Smooth Criminal"
 "Dangerous" / "In the Closet"
 "The Mime Segment": "(I Like) The Way You Love Me" / "Hollywood Tonight" / "Speed Demon" / "Slave to the Rhythm" / "Stranger in Moscow" / "Another Part of Me"
 "Speechless" / "Human Nature"
 "Is It Scary" / "Ghosts" / "Somebody's Watching Me" / "Monster" / "Threatened" ("Threatened" was only on selected days)
 "Thriller"
 "You Are Not Alone" / "I Just Can't Stop Loving You"
 "Beat It" / "State of Shock"
 "Jam"
 "Earth Song" / "Planet Earth"
 "Scream" / "Little Susie"
 "Gone Too Soon" (Only on selected days)
 "They Don't Care About Us" / "Privacy" / "Tabloid Junkie"
 "Heal the World" / "Will You Be There"
 "I'll Be There" (Video interlude)
 "Immortal Megamix": "Can You Feel It" / "Don't Stop 'Til You Get Enough" / "Billie Jean" / "Black or White"
 "Man in the Mirror"
 "Remember the Time" / "Bad" (Curtain call music)

*Also includes: "Goin' Back to Indiana" / "Rockin' Robin" / "I Got the Feelin'"

Shows

Cancelled shows

Personnel

Main 
Writer and director — Jamie King
Creation director — Chantal Tremblay
Associate Show Director - Carla Kama
Musical designer — Kevin Antunes
Music — Michael Jackson
Remixer — Kevin Antunes
Set designer — Mark Fisher
Props and scenic designer — Michael Curry
Costume designer — Zaldy Goco
Acrobatic performance designer — Germain Guillemot
Rigging and acrobatic equipment designer — Scott Osgood
Projection designer — Olivier Goulet
Lighting designer — Martin Labrecque
Sound designer — François Desjardins

Band 
Musical director — Greg Phillinganes
Keyboards — Greg Phillinganes, Darrell Smith, Charles Wilson 
Drums — Jonathan "Sugarfoot" Moffett
Guitars — Jon Clark and Desiree Bassett
Bass — Don Boyette
Percussion — Taku Hirano and Bashiri Johnson
Horns — Keyon Harrold, Mike Phillips, Michael Ghegan, Ravi Best
Cello — Tina Guo and Mariko
Vocals — Fred White, Jason Woods, Stephanie Alexander, J Marie, and Jory Steinberg

Performers 
Main dancers —Loukas LEECO Kosmidis, Pom Arnold, Jonathan Bayani, Michael Cameron, Tina Cannon, Khalid Freeman, Jawkeen Howard, Ruthy Inchaustegui, Jeff "JBoogie" Kelly,  Shondra Leigh, Cameron Mckinlay,  Fernando Miro, Leo Moctezuma, Gianinni Semedo Moreira, Melena Rounis, Tammy To, Levan Torchinava, Irakli Gelozia, Davi Lorenzo,  Yavuz Topuz, Tomohiko Tsujimoto, Joseph Wiggan & Josette Wiggan, Kendrick Jones & Danielle Hobbs, Jean Sok, and Les Twins
Mimes — Mansour Abdessadok and Jonathan Bayani
Pole dancers — Anna Melnikova, Felix Cane, Talia Marino, Giulia Piolanti
Aerial silks artist — Giulia Piolanti
Straps Artist – Igor Zaripov
Contortionist — Baaska Enkhbaatar
Fanatics — Tomohiko Tsujimoto, Leo Moctezuma, Levan Torchinava, Khalid Freeman, Kendrick Jones, Cameron McKinlay
Acrobats — Vincent Deplanche, Christian Détraz, Stéphane Détraz, Harvey Donnelly, Darren Trull, Kodai Noro, Daisuke Suzuki, Yuta Takahashi, Mitsuhiro Tamura, Tatsuya Tanimoto, Narihito Tonosaki, Loic Weissbrodt, Terrance Harrison, Joshua Rasile, Igor Zaripov

References

External links 
 Official site
 Michael Jackson official site

2011 concert tours
2012 concert tours
2013 concert tours
2014 concert tours
Cirque du Soleil touring shows
Michael Jackson